Canadian Forces Station Leitrim, also referred to as CFS Leitrim, is a Canadian Forces Station located in the neighbourhood of Leitrim in Ottawa, Ontario. It is concerned with the interception, decrypting and processing of communication for the Communications Security Establishment and the Canadian Forces, and forms part of the ECHELON system.

The station's motto Pacem Petere means Research For Peace.

History
CFS Leitrim, located just south of Ottawa, is Canada's oldest operational signal intelligence collection station. Established by the Royal Canadian Corps of Signals in 1941 as I Special Wireless Station and renamed Ottawa Wireless Station in 1949, CFS Leitrim acquired its current name when the Supplementary Radio System was created in 1966. In 1946, the station's complement was 75 personnel. The current strength is 950 military personnel and 50+ civilian employees.

To enhance security, Leitrim road, which passed directly in front of the station, was diverted roughly 200m to the south of the station in 2013.

Function
CFS Leitrim provides technical and logistical support to the following units located on the Station:

 Canadian Forces Information Operations Group Headquarters (CFIOGHQ)
 Canadian Forces Network Operations Centre (CFNOC)
 Canadian Forces Signals Intelligence Operations Centre (CFSOC)
 Joint Information and Intelligence Fusion Centre (JIIFC) Detachment

CFS Leitrim remotely operates equipment at the following intercept stations:

 CFS Alert, Nunavut
 CFB Gander, Newfoundland and Labrador - Wullenweber AN/FRD-10 circularly disposed antenna array for High-frequency direction finding
 CFS Leitrim Detachment Masset, British Columbia (formerly CFS Masset)

See also
 List of cyber warfare forces

References

External links
 Badge
 Station designator
 Official DND website
 Aerial view of Pusher HFDF array

Leitrim
Leitrim
Leitrim
Buildings and structures in Ottawa